The San Jose Earthquakes U23, were an American soccer team based in Turlock, California. They were the development team for the MLS San Jose Earthquakes. The team played in the USL Premier Development League (PDL), the fourth tier of the American Soccer Pyramid, in the Southwest Division of the Western Conference. 

In their only season in 2014, the U23 Earthquakes finished with 7 wins, 4 losses and 3 ties. They were 6–0–1 in their last seven games, but just missed the playoffs. Defender Ramon Martin Del Campo was named to the All-League and All-Conference teams.

On December 9, 2014, the parent club announced that the new Burlingame Dragons FC would be the Earthquakes official PDL affiliate starting in 2015, replacing the U23 team.

Year-by-year

References

Association football clubs established in 2013
San Jose Earthquakes
Defunct Premier Development League teams
2013 establishments in California
Association football clubs disestablished in 2014
2014 disestablishments in California
Turlock, California